The Castle of Pioz (Spanish: Castillo de Pioz) is a castle located in Pioz, Spain. It was declared Bien de Interés Cultural in 1990.

References 

Bien de Interés Cultural landmarks in the Province of Guadalajara
Castles in Castilla–La Mancha